Troung's gecko (Gekko truongi) is a species of lizard in the family Gekkonidae. The species is endemic to Vietnam.

Etymology
The specific name, truongi is in honor of Vietnamese herpetologist Truong Quang Nguyen.

Geographic range
G. truongi is found in southern Vietnam, in Khánh Hòa Province.

Habitat
The preferred natural habitat of G. truongi is forest.

Description

References

Further reading
Phung TM, Ziegler T (2011). "Another new Gekko species (Squamata: Gekkonidae) from southern Vietnam". Zootaxa 3129: 51–61. (Gekko truongi, new species).

Gekko
Reptiles described in 2011
Endemic fauna of Vietnam
Reptiles of Vietnam